2017 Afghanistan attack may refer to:

January 2017 Afghanistan bombings
February 2017 Supreme Court of Afghanistan attack
March 2017 Kabul attack
2017 Nangarhar airstrike
2017 Afghanistan–Pakistan border skirmish
May 2017 Kabul attack
3 June 2017 Kabul bombing
June 2017 Herat mosque bombing
June 2017 Kabul mosque attack
June 2017 Lashkargah bombing
24 July 2017 Kabul bombing
2017 attack on the Iraqi embassy in Kabul
August 2017 Herat mosque attack
28 December 2017 Kabul suicide bombing